PCD is the debut studio album by American girl group The Pussycat Dolls, released on September 12, 2005, by A&M Records.   In 1995, the Pussycat Dolls were created as a burlesque troupe by choreographer Robin Antin. After attracting media attention, Antin struck a joint venture with Interscope Records to develop the Pussycat Dolls into a brand, with Jimmy Iovine assigning the project to Ron Fair. As one of the executive producers Fair produced the majority of the album and collaborated with producers like Kwamé, Polow da Don and Rich Harrison. The music style of PCD was described as pop/R&B and urban dance-pop. Lyrically the album incorporates sexual innuendo and explores the themes of feminism and romance. It features guest vocals from rappers Busta Rhymes, Timbaland and will.i.am.

PCD received mixed reviews from contemporary music critics who were favorable towards the selection of dance-pop songs but criticized the album's ballads and covers, feeling it contradicted the group's sexual image. PCD exceeded industry expectations and became a commercial success, reaching the summit in New Zealand and peaking in the top-ten in Australia, Germany, the Netherlands and Switzerland. In the United States, it peaked at number five on the Billboard 200 selling nearly three million copies and currently stands as fourth best-selling album by a girl group in the United Kingdom (with sales of 1.3 million copies) where it reached number eight on the UK Albums Chart.

The first four singles from PCD—"Don't Cha", "Stickwitu", "Beep" and "Buttons"—were commercially successful topping the charts in various countries including New Zealand where all four of them reached atop the singles chart. Subsequent singles, "I Don't Need a Man" and "Wait a Minute", were less successful. Promotion includes radio appearances, print interviews, and live performances of its songs in various television shows such as the 2005 MTV Europe Music Awards and the American Music Awards of 2006. In conjunction with these appearances, the Pussycat Dolls extensively toured the album in a combination of headlining and supporting shows until 2007.

Background and recording
The Pussycat Dolls were created by choreographer Robin Antin and her roommate Christina Applegate in 1993 after inviting several dancers to explore Antin's idea of classic Las Vegas-style burlesque and give it a more contemporary spin. In 1995, the group began performing every Thursday at Johnny Depp's Los Angeles club, the Viper Room. In 2002, Gwen Stefani was invited to sing and perform with the Dolls and brought along Interscope Geffen A&M chairman Jimmy Iovine and then-president of A&M Records; both took interest into turning it into a singing group. In 2003, Antin struck a joint venture with Interscope Records to develop the Pussycat Dolls into a brand, with Iovine assigning the project to Fair. Fair stated that he wanted to create an album which would "involve music and visuals". He explained that "there's going to be some technological changes as well as creative changes in the way we go about it." The auditions drew about 500 aspiring performers, of which two singers—Nicole Scherzinger and Melody Thornton—were recruited, joining Carmit Bachar, Ashley Roberts, Jessica Sutta and Kimberly Wyatt to form a new recording group. Fair stated that even though "there were some adequate voices in the original group," Scherzinger and Thornton where needed "to bring the ability." In 2004, they recorded "We Went as Far as We Felt Like Going" for the Shark Tale soundtrack and recorded their own version of "Sway", which was released as single to promote the movie Shall We Dance?.

At the suggestion of Doug Morris—then chairman of Universal Music Group, "Don't Cha", which was originally recorded by Tori Alamaze and became a minor success on Billboards Hot R&B/Hip-Hop Songs chart, was given to the Pussycat Dolls as the label was trying to reinvent the girl group. While "Don't Cha" became an international success worldwide, an album had not been recorded yet. Fair stated, "we scrambled, got into formation" and worked on the album within 30 days at The Record Plant in Hollywood, California. According to Scherzinger, they took the time to put out the best record possible. She further explained that they were very selective with their songs and producers. As one of the executive producers, Fair enlisted a wide range of songwriters and producers for PCD, including CeeLo Green, Rich Harrison, Timbaland, and will.i.am. While searching for songs for the album, an A&R at Interscope Records and friend of Siobhan Fahey, a founding member of the girl group Bananarama, played to Iovine the song "Bitter Pill", which was included on Shakespears Sister's Songs from the Red Room (2009). After Fahey emailed the backing track to the label, it was radically altered and became "Hot Stuff (I Want You Back)", as they sampled Donna Summer's "Hot Stuff" in the chorus. Although Fahey did not like the group's version, financially she was delighted as it helped her fund her recordings.

 Composition 

Inspired by the chorus of "Swass" by Sir Mix-a-Lot, CeeLo Green wrote and produced the opening track, "Don't Cha"; using "controlled and competent" vocals, the Pussycat Dolls taunt a "hapless man" in the chorus because his girlfriend can't be compared to the group. "Don't Cha" also features "garrulous" rap vocals by Busta Rhymes. "Beep", featuring will.i.am, veers from orchestral pop to a "loping and downplayed funk groove" with elements of 1980s pop music. The staccato-like chorus incorporates bleep censors that hides risqué lyrical parts and rejects objectification. It interpolates the song "Evil Woman" by the British rock band Electric Light Orchestra. "Wait a Minute" features the final guest of the album, Timbaland whom with the Pussycat Dolls have a "boy-girl give-and-take". It also includes "sassy handclaps". In the pop ballad "Stickwitu", the group celebrates monogamous relationships. "Buttons" is a hip hop-influenced pop and R&B track featuring "snaky synths" over a Middle Eastern rhythm. Its lyrics "fits right into the burlesque strip tease performances" that the Pussycat Dolls originated from. The post-disco "I Don't Need a Man" sharing the same "quasi-feminism" themes with "Beep", sees the group expressing disinterest in co-dependency towards a male partner. "How Many Times, How Many Lies" is a downtempo ballad which sees Scherzinger lamenting. The seventh track, "Hot Stuff (I Want You Back)", contains elements of "Hot Stuff" performed by Donna Summer. The song is a "throwback mock disco" with elements of electropop. "Bite the Dust" uses "dramatic strings" and was compared to the works of Destiny’s Child. "Right Now", a big band song gives the impression of Broadway musical to the listener. The track incorporates accentuated horns and congas that pay homage to Shirley Bassey. Similarly like  British duo Soft Cell, the group recorded a mashup between Gloria Jones' "Tainted Love" (1965) and The Supremes' "Where Did Our Love Go" (1964). The song was noted for utilizing the "elements of the synth pop classic". The standard edition's closing track, a cover of Nina Simone's "Feeling Good" was described as a "faux-jazz" version of the original song.

 Promotion 
 Singles 

"Don't Cha" was released as the lead single from PCD on April 19, 2005. It received positive reviews from music critics, who praised its catchiness, energy, and, sheer attitude. The song remains the Pussycat Dolls most successful single, topping the national charts of more than ten countries and peaking within the top 10 in eight others. In the United States, "Don't Cha" peaked at number two on the Billboard Hot 100 for three weeks, topped the Hot Dance Club Play and Pop 100 charts for three and seven weeks respectively, and was certified platinum by the Recording Industry Association of America (RIAA), signifying sales of 1,000,000 certified units. An accompanying music video, directed by Paul Hunter was filmed around a week before the single's release. The video shows scenes of the group jumping on a trampoline, drag racing in an abandoned waterway, and performing "provocative dance moves" with the intent to showcase the group's confidence and fun.

"Beep" (featuring will.i.am) had been slated for release as the second single from PCD but was cancelled in favor of "Stickwitu". "Stickwitu" was serviced to US contemporary hit radio stations on September 27, 2005, as the second single. The accompanying music video, directed by Nigel Dick, was released on October 13, 2005. Dick describes the video as a "photographic rendition" of the group's day in the life while being on tour. "Stickwitu" attained top ten status in the United States and other 12 countries, including Australia, New Zealand, Switzerland, and the United Kingdom; in the latter two territories, the song became the Pussycat Dolls' second consecutive number one. As the third single, "Beep" was serviced to US contemporary hit radio on February 7, 2006. For further promotion, the song was accompanied by a music video directed by the Benny Boom. Commercially, "Beep" became the Pussycat Dolls' third consecutive top-three single in Australia, Belgium (Flanders), New Zealand, the Netherlands, and Norway.

An alternate version of "Buttons" featuring Snoop Dogg was released as the album's fourth single. In the United States, the remix was released as a digital download on April 11, 2006, and was sent to contemporary hit radio stations the following month. The song was a commercial success, topping the charts of Austria and New Zealand, where it became the Pussycat Dolls' fourth consecutive number and logged their twelfth week atop. In their native country, "Buttons" peaked at number three on the Billboard Hot 100 chart, topped the Hot Dance Club Play, and surpassed two million digital downloads following "Don't Cha" and future single "When I Grow Up, making the Pussycat Dolls the first girl group in Nielsen SoundScan history to achieve that feat. Filmmaker Francis Lawrence directed the song's music video and is an ode to the group's burlesque origin.

"I Don't Need a Man" was the only song of the album not to impact US radio stations, subsequently becoming their lowest charting song on Billboard Hot 100 at number 93. The song was released as the fifth single on September 25, 2006 in the United Kingdom. Compared to their previous singles, "I Don't Need a Man" was slightly less successful, reaching top-ten in Australia, New Zealand, and the United Kingdom and top-twenty in Austria, Germany, and Switzerland.

“Wait a Minute" impacted contemporary hit radio stations on October 16, 2006. The single was moderately successful, reaching top 40 positions in Australia, Germany, New Zealand, and Sweden.

Promotional single

In December 2006, National Basketball Association (NBA) and American Broadcasting Company (ABC)  selected the Pussycat Dolls' "Right Now" as the opening number for the ABC's coverage of the NBA. The song was used from Christmas through the end of the season and was previewed going into and out of commercial breaks during telecasts. The TV spots features the group perform the song while wearing jerseys of different teams between NBA jump cuts. Subtitled as the "NBA Version", "Right Now" was digitally released as promotional single on January 23, 2007.

 Live performances 

On April 11, 2005, the Pussycat Dolls opened a lounge named after them at Caesar's Palace in Las Vegas; their performance was viewed by number of celebrity guests, including Busta Rhymes, who jumped on stage to perform with them. Following the release of "Don't Cha", it was reported they would appear at various radio shows across the United States, including Miami, Florida, Phoenix, Arizona and at the annual KIIS-FM's Wango Tango music festival. While closing their set with "Don't Cha", MTV's Brandee J. Tecson commented, "like a lot of the day's performers, the Dolls were newcomers to the Wango stage, but ended the night like veterans." On August 14, 2005, the group performed "Don't Cha" at the 2005 Teen Choice Awards. On November 4, 2005, the group appeared at the 2005 MTV Europe Music Awards which were held at Lisbon, Portugal. Borat (portrayed by Sacha Baron Cohen) introduced them as "international prostitutes" and performed "Don't Cha" with a house remix at the end. Couple of days later, the group travelled to Sydney, Australia for a three-day promotional trip that began with meeting four Australian Idol finalists. This was followed with radio, television and print interviews and an appearance at a party organized by teen magazine, Dolly. On December 7, 2005, the Pussycat Dolls performed at the annual KIIS-FM Jingle Ball at the Shrine Auditorium in Los Angeles, California with some members wearing "festive candy-cane-striped belly shirts and red-and-green capri pants". They performed fours songs including "Don't Cha", "Stickwitu" and "Wait a Minute". Twelve days later, the group performed "Stickwitu" at the 2005 Radio Music Awards.

On January 27, 2006, the Pussycat Dolls performed "Don't Cha" and "Sway" during the results show of Dancing with the Stars. On May 18, 2006, they appeared on The Tonight Show with Jay Leno to perform "Buttons". The following month the group performed three songs on Good Morning America as part of its Summer Concert Series. "Buttons" was then performed on an episode of So You Think You Can Dance on July 13, 2006, and at the annual charity fundraiser event Fashion Rocks with rapper Jibbs on September 8, 2006. Couple weeks later they travelled to Germany and performed "Sway" on Wetten, dass..?. On November 21, 2006, they performed "Buttons" at the 2006 American Music Awards. On July 7, 2007, the Pussycat Dolls together with other artists performed at Live Earth, which was held to raise awareness of global warming. They performed "Buttons", "Stickwitu", and "Don't Cha".

 Touring 

The Pussycat Dolls extensively promoted the album either as a headliner or a support act. On January 31, 2006, it was announced that the Pussycat Dolls would support the Black Eyed Peas' Honda Civic Tour, which started on March 21, 2006, in Fresno, California. The leg consisted of other 33 dates, visiting venues in the United States up until the 21st of May. Throughout June of that year, the Pussycat Dolls performed a combination of headlining and supporting shows for the Black Eyed Peas and Take That in Ireland, the Netherlands, Portugal, and the United Kingdom. The following month, the group headlined two shows in Asia. In Kuala Lumpur, Malaysia the group caused controversy for failing to comply with local dress regulations and performing "sexually suggestive" routines. The Pussycat Dolls later supported ten additional Black Eyed Peas' shows in North America, which commenced on August 24, 2006, and concluded on September 8, 2006. In November of the same year, they embarked on their first headlining European tour until February 2007, visiting 21 venues in Germany, Austria, Ireland, and the United Kingdom. The set list consisted mostly songs from PCD and covers such as "Whole Lotta Love". The album received further promotion in 2007 in North America, as they supported Christina Aguilera's Back to Basics Tour in 41 venues between February to May and headlined several shows in-between.

 Critical reception 

In his consumer guide for MSN Music, Robert Christgau gave the album a "one-star honorable mention" indicating "a worthy effort consumers attuned to its overriding aesthetic or individual vision may well like". Christgau selected "Beep" and "Wait a Minute" as highlights commenting that the group is "sexier than your average prefab sexpots, but no fabber". AllMusic of Stephen Thomas Erlewine provided a favorable review, rating it three stars out of five. Erlewine opined that the great thing about the album are the producers and songwriters who are willing to play with the group's "hyper-sexual image, creating a sleek, sexy sound ideal for both nightclubs and strip joints". However he observed the album's ballads "[undercut] the joyous carnal celebration" of dance songs that are not "quite enough to make this [album] the camp classic". While Slant Magazine's Sal Cinquemani deemed group's image as "cartoonish", he was surprised that PCD's content wasn't filled with filler. He further noted that if the Pussycat Dolls would want to make a mark in pop music, they should avoid Diane Warren.

Writing for the USA Today, Elysa Gardner acknowledged that "lead singer Nicole Scherzinger and at least a couple of her fellow Dolls have supple voices" despite their superficiality and the song's "insipid lyrics". Raymond Fiore of Entertainment Weekly also noted the Pussycat Dolls' flexible vocals, but felt the songs from A-list producers cannot "arouse her interest for a whole 45 minutes. A reviewer of The Ledger wrote that the album is "essentially a solo release" from Scherzinger while noting songs like "Right Now" "make it clear that she really needs to keep around those dancing, singing/not-singing gals." musicOMH's John Murphy deemed that in PCD there is a "half-decent album struggling to get out here, but it’s rather drowned by the image and ‘brand opportunities’".

Several reviewers lamented that the inclusion of covers and ballads. Lisa Haines of the BBC lambasted the musical style of the covers noting them as "forgetful". Darryl Sterdan of Jam! called the group "glorified strippers" and mocked them for not writing any of the songs apart from Scherzinger having "token songwriting credits". He went on to describe the covers as "embarrassing" and the ballads as "overcooked". Spence D. of IGN observed that the album's lowest points come from album's ballads.

PCD won the award for Best Album — International at the 2006 TMF Awards, where the group was also nominated for Best Pop — International.

 Commercial performance 

PCD debuted and peaked at number five on the US Billboard 200 with first-week sales of 99,000 copies, according to data compiled by Nielsen SoundScan for the chart dated October 1, 2005. It also debuted at number eight on the US Top R&B/Hip-Hop Albums. On its 45th week the album reentered the top-ten on the chart dated July 26, 2006 and remained in the top-ten for a final time the following week at number nine. PCD was released amidst an era of stagnant album sales due to the emergence of digital and physical piracy and a shift in consumer interest. The album managed to remain within the top 50 for 45 weeks due to the strength of its first four singles, earning them a reputation among the century's few breakout success. Geoff Mayfield, former analyst and director of Billboard charts, commented that this type of success does not happen often. "It's unusual for any act to get as many as four hits off an album anymore. For much of this decade, it's been a real challenge to get a third or even a second hit. And that's not just for new artists. That's for established artists too." As of September 2008, PCD has sold nearly three million copies in the US and the Recording Industry Association of America (RIAA) certified the album double platinum, which denotes shipments of two million copies.

In the United Kingdom, the album entered the UK Albums Chart at number eight, as its lead single, registered its second week atop the UK Singles Chart. With sales of 23,900, PCD was the second highest new entry on the chart that week. After 12 weeks of being outside the top ten, PCD reached number ten on the chart dated December 12, 2005, due to the success of "Stickwitu", which remained atop the UK Singles Chart and helped the album improve its week-to-week sales. The release of the album's fourth single "Buttons" helped the album increase sales for six consecutive weeks, setting a new peak of seven. In June 2019, The Official Charts Company compiled a list with the 40 best-selling albums by female groups of the last 25 years. With sales surpassing 1.3 million copies, PCD is the fourth best-selling album in the UK. The British Phonographic Industry (BPI) certified the album four times platinum for selling 1.2 million copies. In Ireland, 42 weeks after its debut, PCD peaked at number seven in the final week of June 2006.

In mainland Europe PCD performed moderately at the beginning, debuting at number 12 in Germany, 14 in Portugal, 18 in Austria, 26 in Denmark, 35 in Norway, 39 in Finland, 43 in France, 55 in Italy and Sweden, 76 in the Netherlands, 72 in Spain, 92 in Belgium (Flanders), 97 in Belgium (Wallonia), on their respective local album charts. In 2006, PCD improved its chart positions, entering the top-10 in Belgium (Flanders), Germany, the Netherlands, and Norway, and top-twenty in Portugal, Belgium (Wallonia), and Denmark. The album was certified gold in Austria (IFPI), France (SNEP), Norway (IFPI), and Switzerland (IFPI), and received platinum certifications in Belgium (BEA), Germany (BVMI), and the Netherlands (NVPI).

Similarly in Oceania, PCD debuted at number 16 in Australia on the ARIA Top 100 Albums Chart before reaching a new peak of eight in August 2006. The Australian Recording Industry Association (ARIA) certified it triple platinum following shipments of 210,000. In New Zealand, PCD debuted at number twenty-three on September 19, 2005. Six months later and following three consecutive number-one singles,—"Don't Cha", "Stickwitu", and "Beep"—the album peaked atop the album's chart making the Pussycat Dolls the first girl group in over six years to do so since Bardot with their debut self-titled album. PCD returned at the top spot three weeks later and received a double platinum certification by the Recorded Music NZ (RMNZ).

 Track listing Notes  signifies an additional producer
  signifies a vocal producer
  signifies an incidental producer
  signifies a co-producer
  signifies "Tainted Love" beat producer
  signifies an additional vocal producer
  signifies a remixer
  signifies writers were retrospectively credited for writing after the album booklet had been printed.Sampling credits "Don't Cha" contains interpolations of "Swass" performed by Sir Mix-a-Lot.
 "Beep" contains a sample of the recording "Evil Woman" performed by Electric Light Orchestra.
 "Hot Stuff (I Want You Back)" contains elements of "Hot Stuff" performed by Donna Summer and "Bitter Pill" performed by Shakespears Sister.
 "Bite The Dust" samples drums of "Soul Machine", as written by Hall-Gainey-Ash-James and performed by Harvey and The Phenomenals
 "We Went as Far as We Felt Like Going" is a medley between "Far as We Felt Like Goin'" performed by Labelle and "Take Your Time (Do It Right)" performed by The S.O.S. Band.

Personnel
Credits adapted from the liner notes of PCD.PerformersNicole Scherzinger – lead vocals, background vocals
Carmit Bachar – vocals, backing vocals
Melody Thornton – vocals, backing vocals
Ashley Roberts  – background vocals 
Jessica Sutta  – background vocals
Kimberly Wyatt – background vocals
Busta Rhymes – featuring artist, vocals, co-writer (track 1)
will.i.am – featuring artist, vocals, co-writer (track 2)
Timbaland – featuring artist, vocals (track 3)
Kara DioGuardi – additional background vocals (track 14)
Kaya Jones – additional background vocals (tracks 13 & 15)The PCD OrchestraViolins – Endre Granat, Natalie Leggett, Bruce Dukov, Jackie Brand, Charlie Bisharat, Joel Derouin, Sara Parkins, Mario Deleon, Josefina Vergara, Tammy Hatwan, Sid Page, Roberto Cani, Katia Popov, Phillip Levy, Songa Lee, Robin Olson, Anatoly Rosinsky, Armen Garabedian, Theresa Stanislov, Sarah Thornblade, Alan Grunfeld, Alyssa Park
Violas – Bryan Dembow (P), Simon Oswell, Sam Formicola, Matt Funes, Darrin McCann, Vicky Miskolczy
Cello – Steve Erbody, Larry Corbett, David Low, Suzie Katayama, Armen Ksajikian, Cecilia Tsan
Orchestra Contractor – Bill Hughes
Bass – Pino PalladinoTechnical'

CeeLo Green – production (track 1)
Ethan Mates – engineering (track 1)
Steve Baughman – mixing (track 1)
John Goux – guitar (tracks 1, 11)
Ray Herrman – sax (track 1)
Nick Lane – trombone (track 1)
Bill Churchvile – trumpet (track 1)
Chris Tedesco – trumpet, horn (track 1)
will.i.am – production (track 2)
Ron Fair – vocal production (tracks 2, 5 - 7), production (tracks 2, 4, 5, 8, 10 - 13, 15), string arrangement and conduct (tracks 2, 4, 10, 12), mixing (tracks 3, 7), organ, rhodes (tracks 4, 12), incidental production (tracks 3, 6), vocal arrangement (tracks 6, 7), wurlitzer (tracks 2, 6, 8), piano (tracks 4, 6, 8, 12), glockspiel (track 6), harmonica (tracks 4, 8, 12), clavinet (track 8), additional production (track 9), additional string arrangement (track 10), keyboards (track 11)
Tal Herzberg – additional programming (track 2), Pro Tools, engineering (tracks 2, 3, 5 - 12), co-production (tracks 4, 5, 10 - 13, 15), bass (tracks 2, 4, 6, 8, 11)
Dave "Hard Drive" Pensado – mixing (tracks 2, 3, 5, 9)
Charlie Bisharat – electric violin (tracks 2, 5)
The PCD Orchestra – strings (tracks 2, 4, 7 - 12)
JD Andrew – recording (track 2), engineering (tracks 5 - 11), vocal recording (track 11)
Bill Schnee – strings recording (tracks 2, 7 - 12)
Mike "Angry" Eleopoulos – additional engineering (tracks 2, 4, 9), engineering (tracks 5 - 12), vocal recording (track 11)
Ariel Chobaz – assistant mix engineering (tracks 2 - 5, 9) 
Timbaland – production (track 3)
Keri Hilson – production (track 3), vocal production (track 9),
Jerry Hey – horn arrangement, horns (tracks 3, 6, 9, 11), string arrangement and conduct, trumpets (track 10)
Dan Higgins – horns (tracks 3, 6, 9, 11)
Gary Grant – horns (tracks 3, 6, 9, 11), trumpets (track 10)
Bill Reichenbach – horns (tracks 3, 6, 9, 11)
Dan Higgins – horns (tracks 3, 6, 9, 11)
Marcella Araica – recording (track 3)
Demacio "Demo" Castellon – recording (track 3)
Peter Mokran – recording (tracks 4, 8)
Robert Palmer – original drum programming (track 4)
Cori Jacobs – rhodes (tracks 4, 12)
Allen Sides – string recording (track 4)
Polow Da Don – production, arrangement, programming (track 5)
Sean Garrett – production (track 5)
Young Smoke – co-production (track 5)

Luis Conte – percussion (tracks 5, 10)
Rich Harrison – production, programming (track 6)
Scotty Beats – engineering (track 6)
Mike Hogue – assistant mix engineering (track 6)
Siobhan Fahey – production (track 7)
The Droyds – production (track 7)
Steven Gallifent – production (track 7)
Andy Chatterley – arrangement (track 7)
Nicole Scherzinger – vocal arrangement (track 7)
Tyler Coomes – programming (track 8)
Tim Carmon – organ (track 8)
Jun Ishizeki – assistant mix engineering (tracks 8, 11)
Kwamé "K1MiL" – production (track 9)
Anthony Kilhoffer – Pro Tools, engineering (track 9)
Michael C Ross – mixing (track 10)
Vinnie Colaiuta – mixing (track 10)
Mike Valerio – bass (track 10)
Wayne Bergeron – trumpets (track 10)
Larry Hall – trumpets, trombones (track 10)
Frank Wolf – mixing (track 10)
Andy Martin – trombones (track 10)
Bruce Otto – trombones (track 10)
Larry Williams – woodwinds (track 10)
Brandon Fields – woodwinds (track 10)
Bill Liston – woodwinds (track 10)
Joel Peskin – woodwinds (track 10)
Bob Zimmitti – timpani (track 10)
Brian Vibberts – assistant mix engineering (track 10)
Big Tank – "Tainted Love" beat production (track 11)
Tony Maserati – mixing (track 11)
Jack Joseph Puig – mixing (track 12)
Abe Laboriel, Jr. – drums (track 12)
Alex Al – drums (track 12)
Dean Nelson – drums (track 12)
Greg Wells – production, engineering, programming, guitar, keys (track 14)
Kara DioGuardi – production (track 14)
Chris Lord-Alge – mixing (track 14)
Steve MacMillan – engineering (track 14)
Chris Steffen – engineering (track 14)
Fabien Waltmann – additional programming (track 14)
Brian Gardner – mastering

Charts

Weekly charts

Decade-end charts

Year-end charts

Certifications and sales

Release history

See also
List of number-one albums in 2006 (New Zealand)
List of best-selling albums of the 2000s in the United Kingdom

References

External links 

 
 

2005 debut albums
The Pussycat Dolls albums
A&M Records albums
Interscope Records albums
Interscope Geffen A&M Records albums
Albums produced by Polow da Don
Albums produced by Ron Fair
Albums produced by Sean Garrett
Albums produced by Rich Harrison
Albums produced by Jimmy Iovine
Albums produced by Timbaland
Albums produced by will.i.am
Albums produced by Greg Wells